Suni Q'awa (Aymara suni unpopulated, deserted, q'awa little river, ditch, crevice, fissure, gap in the earth, riverbed, "unpopulated brook" or "unpopulated ravine", also spelled Soni Khaua) or Sani Q'awa (Aymara sani a variety of potatoes, "sani brook" or "sani ravine", also spelled Sani Khaua)  is a  mountain in the Andes of Bolivia. It is located in the La Paz Department, Pacajes Province, in the south-west of the Calacoto Municipality. The mountain lies north-west of the Anallajsi volcano and north-east of the mountains Ch'uxña Quta and Chinchillani.

References 

Mountains of La Paz Department (Bolivia)